Dante in Hell or Dante, led by Virgil, Consoles the Souls of the Envious is an 1835 oil-on-canvas painting by Hippolyte Flandrin. Contrary to its primary title, it shows a scene from the Circle of the Envious, the second circle of Purgatory in Canto III of Purgatorio. The scene depicts Dante on the mountain of Purgatorio trying to comfort the blind men. It is now in the Museum of Fine Arts of Lyon.

Sources
  This source analyzes the third canto of Purgatorio. 

 "Flandrin family." Grove Art Online. 2003. Oxford University Press. Date of access 10 Dec. 2020, This article focuses on the Flandrin family. Contains a long portion about Jean-Hippolyte Flandrin and his artistic career. Highlights his achievements and artistic focuses.

  This article is an in-depth look at Hippolyte Flandrin's career and specifically his downfall as an artist despite being one of Ingres’s most accomplished students.
Lagrange, Léon, "Hippolyte Flandrin, sa vie et ses œuvres", in Le Correspondant, 11 Avril 1864, p745

Paintings by Hippolyte Flandrin
Paintings based on works by Dante Alighieri
Cultural depictions of Dante Alighieri
1835 paintings
Paintings in the collection of the Museum of Fine Arts of Lyon
Works based on Purgatorio